Jesús Antonio Isijara Rodríguez (born 26 September 1989), also known as El Ratón, is a Mexican professional footballer who plays as a winger.

International career
Isijara was named to the preliminary list of the senior national team for the 2017 gold cup but was eventually cut off.

Honours
Santos Laguna
Liga MX: Clausura 2018

References

External links

Liga MX players
Living people
1989 births
Mexican footballers
Club Necaxa footballers
San Luis F.C. players
Santos Laguna footballers
Atlas F.C. footballers
People from Navolato
Association football midfielders